Liaoning Daily is the official newspaper of the Liaoning Provincial Committee of the Chinese Communist Party, published since September 1, 1954 by the Liaoning Daily Newspaper Group. The paper's predecessor was the Northeast Daily, which was the organ of the Northeast Bureau of the CCP Central Committee.

History
On November 1, 1945, the Chinese Communist Party founded the Northeast Daily in Northeast China, which is today's Liaoning Daily, and on August 31, 1954, the Greater Administrative Area of Northeast was abolished, and the publication of the Northeast Daily was officially suspended. On September 1, 1954, Liaoning Daily was officially launched.

Sister publications and website
The paper's publisher also operate lnd.com.cn and publish Liaoshen Evening News (辽沈晚报), Peninsula Morning Paper (半岛晨报) and Northern Morning Post (北方晨报).

References

External links  
 

Daily newspapers published in China
Chinese-language newspapers (Simplified Chinese)
Publications established in 1954
Chinese Communist Party newspapers
Mass media in Shenyang